Punkzilla is a 2001 compilation album consisting of songs by bands on Nitro Records.

Track listing

References

External links
Punkzilla on Nitro Records

2001 compilation albums
Punk rock compilation albums
Nitro Records compilation albums